"Sugar Kane" is the third single from Sonic Youth's 1992 album Dirty. It was released in 1993 on DGC.

Music video
The music video for Sugar Kane was directed by Nick Egan. The video was shot in New York City and portrayed Sonic Youth performing in the midst of a fashion show that showcased "grunge" clothing.  The clothing, in fact, was one of the collections ("Grunge Collection") done by Marc Jacobs for Perry Ellis in 1992. Jacobs was a close friend of bassist Kim Gordon and the band. The video also marked the first film appearance of Chloë Sevigny.

Track listings and formats
 Canadian and United States CD single
 "Sugar Kane" (Edit) – 4:58
 "The Destroyed Room"  – 3:19
 "Purr" (Acoustic/Mark Goodier Version) – 4:55
 "The End of the End of the Ugly"  – 4:10
 UK 10" vinyl, EU 12" vinyl, and UK CD single
 "Sugar Kane" (The Short and Sweet Version) – 4:58
 "Is It My Body"  – 2:52
 "Personality Crisis"  – 3:48
 "The End of the End of the Ugly"  – 4:10
 UK cassette
 "Sugar Kane" (The Short and Sweet Version) – 4:58
 "The End of the End of the Ugly"  – 4:10

Charts

References

Sonic Youth - Discography - Sugar Kane

Sonic Youth songs
1993 singles
Song recordings produced by Butch Vig
1992 songs
DGC Records singles